The 2015 Yuen Long protest, called Liberate Yuen Long or Recover Yuen Long by the protesters, was part of a series of anti-parallel trading protests in the northern districts of Hong Kong that took place on 1 March 2015 in Yuen Long. It was mainly organised by Civic Passion, Hong Kong Indigenous and groups from social media and local residents. The protesters rallied against the parallel traders who buy goods in Hong Kong, especially in Yuen Long, and sell them in Mainland China for profit.

Cause
The trigger of this protest is the parallel traders from Mainland China who use multiple entry visa policy to import goods, such as milk powder, shampoo, medicine back to China and sell them. The parallel traders were mainly active in the North District. Perceived shortages and inflation led the residents there to respond with the "Recover Sheung Shui" campaign to protest this situation in 2012. However, the parallel traders' sphere of activity expanded to Tuen Mun, Sha Tin and Yuen Long due to the convenience of transportation and led to the "liberate" activities of these districts.

Development
Around 200 people gathered at Long Ping station at 3:30 pm and arrived Sau Fu Street at 4 pm. At 4:15 pm, protesters tried to break the police line and pushed against the pro-parallel trading elements on Sau Fu Street, when the police used pepper spray without warning. Some pro-parallel trading people were using foul language and threw their fists at the protesters. Several people were arrested by the police, including a girl who was bleeding on her face. At 4:30 pm, more than 50 members of Civic Passion regrouped and demanded for the abolition of the multiple entry visa policy. The dispute between the pro- and anti-parallel trading elements continued as the group moved to Tung Lok Street at 5:15 pm. At 6 pm, people gathered on the Yuen Long Main Road and halted the traffic. Some protesters started to set up some obstacles, such as rubbish bins at the centre. From 7 to 8 pm, dozens of anti-parallel trading groups marched from Yuen Long Main Road to Kau Yuk Road and attempted to occupy the area. Many protesters still stayed in the protest zone at 10:30 pm.

The police used pepper spray 21 times to control the chaotic situation. Later, the police has arrested 36 men and 2 women, aged from 13 to 74, who involved in common assault, assaulting police and possession of weapons. Also, five police officers were injured and had to receive treatment in hospital.

Effect

The host hopes to add more pressure to the government to face the problem of parallel traders. Recently, the government addressed that it had sent a proposal to the Beijing authority to regulate the "multiple-entry permit" plan, which reveals the protest was effective. Also, after the protest, the conflicts between Hongkongers and mainlanders intensified so parallel traders stopped smuggling and decreased the frequency of travelling to Hong Kong.

Some shops were forced to close because of the chaos. Since too many people gathered together and scuffles broke out. Some managers closed their shops to ensure their safety and that more or less badly affected their operation. About 30 shops had been forced to close. Also, members of the Hong Kong General Chamber of Commerce could sue over their losses.

Meanwhile, the traffic was blocked by the protesters. owing to the large number of people and narrow pavement, some protesters were forced to stand at the highway and needed police to direct the traffic. The traffic of Yuen Long Main Road was suspended because protesters occupied the area there.

Response

Government
Hong Kong Secretary for Security Lai Tung-kwok, said public could express their views within the confines of the law. Police definitely would not tolerate illegal behaviour, and would enforce the law. He also added that the authority would continue to combat related offences.
Hong Kong Secretary for Commerce and Economic Development Gregory So Kam-leung, emphasises that the Individual Visit Scheme is important to Hong Kong. The authority cannot change the policy. He also added that cancelling "multiple-entry permit" scheme these proposals are substantial adjustments, the authority needs to consider carefully. Also, he thinks public should not confuse parallel trader with visitors.

Mainland Chinese media
The Xinhua News Agency had reported the Liberate Yuen Long Protests. It reported that some of the Hong Kong individual radical groups launch Liberte Yuen Long Campaign will bring about the nuisance to merchant in Yuen Long. Also, Hong Kong residence and some community organisation expressed great indignation to those demonstrators, and require that police would enforce the law firmly.

Shap Pat Heung Rural Committee
Before the demonstration, the chairperson of Shap Pat Heung Rural Committee threatened that villagers had been overwhelmed and surrounded protesters when they stepped out Long Ping station. They could not take any advantages if their behaved violently. Villagers could counterattack tenfold. In addition, five hundred police had been stood by to cope with the protest.

Yuen Long residents
Some of the Yuen Long residents were dissatisfied with the parallel traders. A local opined that parallel traders caused road congestions which brought about traffic problems, and because of the increasing number of pharmacies and gold shops aimed at parallel traders instead of shops aimed at locals, he hoped multiple-entry permits should be revoked.

Some local residents did not agree with this campaign and believed the protesters were "stirring up trouble".

Follow-up action
On 8 March, some Internet users organised the fourth "liberate" action—Visiting Sheung Shui through social networking group. The aim of this operation was similar to the previous demonstration. At 4 pm, protesters responded to the exhortation from organizers and went to Tuen Mun. They demonstrated by shouting slogans loudly in different shopping malls. Some citizens caused chaos and collided with parallel traders near B3X bus stop. At night, about 30 protesters went to Hong Kong Clock Tower continue demonstration. Finally, they were stopped by police and dismissed. The police arrested 7 people in total, aged 13 to 21.

See also
 2019–20 Hong Kong protests § Reclaim Yuen Long, another protest held in Yuen Long

References

2015 in Hong Kong
Protests in Hong Kong
Localism in Hong Kong
Yuen Long